Little New Year, also known as the Festival of the Kitchen God, is a festival in the traditional lunisolar Chinese calendar. It honors the Kitchen God and takes place on the 23rd or 24th day of the twelfth month in the Chinese calendar, which corresponds to roughly a week before the Chinese New Year.

Traditional Activities 

 Sacrifices to the Kitchen God

When little new year rolls around the Jade Emperor decides accordingly to the family's yearly behavior to decide if he will reward or punish them. The Kitchen God serves as the messenger to report back to the Jade Emperor. Folks burn a paper image of the god in order to dispatch his spirit into heaven to do so and afterwards they put a new image next to the stove to welcome him back in order to oversee and protect the family again. While that happens, sacrifices are made to him in hopes to seal his mouth and leading him to only saying good things about the family.

 House Cleaning

House cleaning happens between the eighth day of the last lunar month (when Laba Festival happens) and Little New Year, Chinese beliefs call for folks to clean themselves and their housing since it is said that ghosts and spirits must either return to Heaven or stay on Earth. So to ensure that they leave, people clean every corner of their home. During this time, the house is also cleaned with the goal of making it anti-virus so the new year does not start with a sickness.

 Eating Guandong Candy

Guandong candy is a treat made of glutinous millet and sprouted wheat. It is said that if your mouth was full of candy you wouldn't be able to bad-mouth others.

 Pasting Paper Cuts to The Window

Similarly to the kitchen god picture, the old paper cuts are taken down and then new ones are put up and it is an indication to the beginning of spring. The paper cuts are usually of the word 福 indicating the peoples wish for a lucky year. The cut is also usually up side down since in Chinese up side downs sounds like "to arrive" so they are wishing for luck to arrive.

 Spring Festival Preparation

The preparation process has to be all done in advance. There is a wide variety to things to do and prepare with most of them revolving around the word "new", often new clothing. Things like firecrackers are bought to use as celebration and a popular item is the red envelopes since it is the peoples belief for the young ones to "respect the elderly" and in return the elderly "love the youth", usually it is money inside the red envelopes.

References 

Chinese New Year